Cantharellus pallens, the pale chanterelle, is a species of Cantharellus from Europe.

References

External links
 
 

pallens
Fungi described in 1959